The yellow pike conger (Congresox talabon) is an eel in the family Muraenesocidae (pike congers). It was described by Georges Cuvier in 1829. It is a tropical eel which migrates between marine and brackish waters, though not for breeding purposes. It is known from the Indo-West Pacific, including Sri Lanka, the Bay of Bengal, and Indonesia. It dwells at a maximum depth of 100 m, inhabits the soft bottoms of coastal waters and estuaries, and leads a nocturnal lifestyle. Males can reach a maximum total length of 80 cm, but more commonly reach 50 cm.

The yellow pike conger feeds mostly on bottom-dwelling fish and crustaceans. It is of minor importance in commercial fisheries, and is mostly marketed fresh.

References

Muraenesocidae
Fish described in 1829
Taxa named by Georges Cuvier